Cristian Yonathan Calderón Del Real (born 24 May 1997), also known as Chicote, is a Mexican professional footballer who plays as a left-back for Liga MX club Guadalajara.

Club career
Calderón participated in the youth teams of Coras de Nayarit FC and C.D. De los Altos before joining Altas FC's youth team. He made his professional debut with Altas on 21 October 2015 against Club Tijuana in a Copa MX quarter-finals match, ultimately winning 5–4 in a penalty shoot-out after a 2–2 tie. He made his Liga MX debut on 7 May 2016 against Tijuana, finishing in a scoreless draw. He became a starter for the first team in the 2018 Apertura.

He was signed by Club Necaxa for the 2019 Clausura. He made his debut for Necaxa on 5 March 2019, scoring his first goals as a brace against Club América, winning 3–1. At the end of the 2019 Apertura, he was listed in the Best XI of the tournament. According to a poll held by Mexican sports newspaper Récord, its readers voted Calderón as the best player of the tournament.

On 11 December 2019, it was announced that C.D. Guadalajara signed Calderón. On 18 January 2020, he made his league debut with the club coming on as a substitute against Pachuca in a 0–0 tie. Three days later, he would score his first goal with the club, scoring a stoppage-time header in a 2–1 loss against Dorados de Sinaloa during the first round-of-16 leg of the Copa MX. A week later in the second leg, he would score a bicycle kick in a 1–0 victory, helping send Guadalajara to a penalty shoot-out that was eventually lost.

On 15 August 2020, he scored the winning goal against Atlético San Luis in a 2–1 home victory, his first league goal with the club and giving newly appointed manager Victor Manuel Vucetich his first win with the club. In November 2020, facing rivals Club América during the Guardianes championship quarter-finals, he scored three times, all long-range shots from outside of the box, in the span of two legs giving Guadalajara a 3–1 aggregate victory.

International career

Youth
In May 2019, Calderón was called up by Jaime Lozano to participate in that year's Toulon Tournament. In the third-place match against the Republic of Ireland, he would score during the penalty shoot-out, helping Mexico win 4–3.

Senior
In September 2019, Calderón received his first call-up to the senior national team by Gerardo Martino and on 2 October 2019 in a friendly against Trinidad & Tobago, he made his debut. He started the game and was substituted at half-time.

Career statistics

Club

International

Honours
Individual
Liga MX Best XI: Apertura 2019
Récord Player of the Tournament: Apertura 2019

References

External links

1997 births
Living people
Footballers from Nayarit
People from Tepic
Association football defenders
Mexican footballers
Mexico international footballers
Coras de Nayarit F.C. footballers
Atlas F.C. footballers
Club Necaxa footballers